Polichinelle is The Prayer Boat's second full-length album, released on March 20, 2001 on Atlantic/Setanta records.

Track listing

External links
Emmett Tinley
The Prayer Boat

2001 albums